Balıkesir is a city in Turkey and is the capital city of Balıkesir Province. Balıkesir is located in the Marmara region of Turkey and has a population of 338,936. Between 1341–1922, it was the capital of Karasi.

History 

Close to modern Balıkesir was the Roman town of Hadrianutherae, founded, as its name commemorates, by the emperor Hadrian. Hadrian came to the region in A.D. 124, as a result of a successful bear hunting he had established a city called his name here. It is estimated that the city consisted of the castle, the homestead, the stud and a few homes. It is thought that the small town was where the current stadium is present. 

Members of the Roman and Pre-Byzantine dynasty had used this castle as a vacation area and for hunting. During the Byzantine period, the small town which had become increasingly neglected was known as Palaiokastron meaning Old Castle.

Also, when the Turkomans came from Middle Asia to Mysia, they called it Balukiser because of the remains of the castle, as Hisar is the Turkish word for castle. Balıkesir's former name was Karasi because Balıkesir city was founded by Karasi Bey in the 13th century as using the remains of the small town. 1297 is considered as the date of establishment of the city which was one of the few to be founded by the Turks in Anatolia. The Karasids was a Turkic principality in Mysia. Since the 13th century, Balıkesir city have been the administrative centre of the Mysia region.

In 1345, Balıkesir city was annexed by the Ottomans. In 1898 an earthquake destroyed much of the city. The number of buildings that were not destroyed in the 1898 earthquake was only 51. In 1914, Turkish students marched through the streets of the city singing a song of hatred against the Greeks. In April 1916, the Christian Greeks of the villages in the vicinity of Balikesser underwent persecution from the Turks. They were refused bread on payment. The women were told that they should become Muslim so as not to die of hunger.

At the beginning of June, many young Greeks were forced by the authorities to convert to Islam at Government headquarters. On 30 June 1919 Balıkesir city was conquered by the invading Greeks but on 6 September 1922, the Turkish Army took back the city. During the Turkish War of Independence, Balıkesir was the main centre of the Turkish militias in Western Anatolia against the occupying Greek Army.

On 3 August 1950, a major fire destroyed the centre of the city which was rebuilt later. That fire destroyed an important part of the city. According to estimates, it was the result of the firing of firecrackers belonging to child guns in a shop. According to another opinion, it was caused by the gnawing of the firecrackers of child guns by rats and this fire spread to the electrical contact. 498 shops completely burned.
It is the second biggest disaster to befall in Balıkesir after the 1898 earthquake. Nearly a thousand people were unemployed. The tents were set up by the Turkish Red Crescent and food aid was provided for a long time.

Economy 

The economic base of the city is both agricultural and industrial. The biggest industrial enterprises are Arı-Turyağ, Limak-Set Çimento, BEST, Mar-Tük, İşbir, Kula, Tellioğlu, Bu Piliç and Yarış Kabin which are among the first thousand factories in Turkey as of 2008. Balıkesir city is also important for stock breeding. Surrounding the city, are numerous dairies. The city is also an agricultural centre. Wheat, sunflowers, sugar beets, and other vegetables in a front tomato and bean plantations have dense products. Traditional crops are melon and grapes. Balıkesir with its districts is the 12th largest economy in the Turkish economy. Also, it is called the Anatolian Tigers.

Agriculture 
Other main exports are olive-based products. It is also a popular destination for both domestic and foreign tourists, who use it as a base to explore the near countryside which is renowned for its beauty, especially nearby Mount Ida (Kaz Dağı).

Mining 
The city is well known with borax deposit. The largest global borax deposits known, many still untapped, are in Central and Western Turkey, including the provinces of Eskişehir, Kütahya and Balıkesir. Besides, Turkey and the United States are the largest producers of boron products. Turkey produces about half of the global yearly demand with the known deposits which possesses 72% of the world.

Cityscape
The central of Balıkesir province with 300,000 population is the fourth crowded city in the Marmara Region. Balıkesir has an aggregate settlement network. Until the 1950s, the city has grown by depending on the core being first settlements that it resembles break-up of the oil stains. The city has been carrying more Aegean character than Marmara.
Aygören, Karaoğlan, Dumlupınar, Kasaplar, Hisariçi, Karesi, Kızpınar, Hacıilbey are the first settlements of the city. The eldest settlements are acclivity, lane and also have adjoint buildings. Many historical places are in these quarters. A summary of new settlements are Bahcelievler, Atatürk, Paşaalanı and Adnan Menderes quarters.

The squares of the city: Ali Hikmet Pasha, Republica, Wrestler Kurtdereli Mehmet and Karesi.

Trade and economic life are concentrated on three streets. Anafartalar Street, Milli Kuvvetler Street, Vasıf Çınar Street, Kızılay Street, Atalar Street are important streets in the city. Commercial life focuses on these streets and the small streets which are intersecting these streets and avenues.

As a part of the city skyline, New Bazaar Area is the oldest shopping place for the city. Vasıf Çınar Street and Gazi Boulevard are other busy areas. The face of the government, there is Balıkesir Park, the rest area, is one of Turkey's most beautiful parks. By the establishment of Balıkesir University in the city, social life is gradually developing. Commercial life in Balıkesir is growing with modern shopping centres such as Yay/ada, 10 Burda, Avlu Balıkesir

Salih Tozan Cultural Center is important for cultural activities in the city. Public transport area where is the point of transport networks is near the Salih Tozan.

Also, Turkey's first jet base, 9th Main Air Base is also located in Balıkesir.

Main sights
The capital of Balıkesir province contains many historical buildings;

 The Saat Kulesi (Clock Tower) is the symbol of the city, built by Mehmet Pasha in 1827. is a smaller version of the Galata Tower. It destroyed in 1898 as a result of the big earthquake and rebuilt in 1901 in its final form. 
 Şadırvan (The Historical Fountain) is a popular fountain built in 1908 near the Saat Kulesi.
Zaganos Pasha Mosque built by and named after the Grand Vizier of Mehmet the Conqueror, Zaganos Pasha in 1461, was once part of a great complex. Today only the mosque and baths remain. The Zaganos Pasha Mosque Complex and Yildirim Mosque are popular spiritual areas.
Yildirim Mosque is the oldest remaining work from the Ottoman period in Balikesir city. Bayezid I had it built-in 1388 in the second half of the 14th century.
Umurbey Mosque has an epitaph of three lines engraved on marble using a special script called Sülüs. The date is 1412.
The Karesi Bey Mausoleum was built in 1336. It contains the cenotaphs of Karesi Bey and his five sons. Karesi Bey's sarcophagus is decorated with Sufic script. 
But only three windmills remain. Hunting and tracking are the best sports, accompanied by windmill views. 
Değirmen Boğazı (means strait of a mill) is a forest area 10 km from Balıkesir on the way to Bursa, lies nestled between two hills; on holidays and weekends families flock to this scenic spot. This picnic place contains tea gardens and restaurants.
Atatürk Parkı (Balikesir City Park) is a park which has been in service since the 1960s. The ground is covered with grass. There is a poolside café and rest facility. Celtis (Hackberry) and pine trees are all over the park.
Balikesir Local-Civil Houses are the city's oldest districts (Aygoren and Karaoglan district) have historical and traditional houses which show the economy and lifestyle of the city until the 1500s.
Thermal Resorts or thermal springs are very famous in Balıkesir. The major thermal spas are Pamukçu, Ilıca, Kepekler and Hisaralanı.
Balıkesir National Photography Museum is the only photography museum in Turkey.
 The Museum of National Moment exhibits historical memories of the city.

Culture 
Many theatre players, actor, actress, singer and painter were born in Balıkesir. Most known are;

Fikret Hakan – Actor
Şevket Altuğ - Actor
Necdet Tosun - Actor
Erdal Tosun - Actor
Reha Yurdakul - Actor
Tamer Yigit - Actor
İlker Ayrık - Actor
Barış Falay - Actor
Hande Erçel -  Actress and model
Ozan Önen – Writer
Zerrin Tekindor - Actress and artist
Tuğçe Kazaz - Actress and model
Orhan İslimyeli - Cartoonist
Salih Tozan - Actor

Memorial days 

The major memorial days of Balıkesir are Hıdrellez, The Liberation Day and also The Remembrance Day of Local Combat.

Hıdrellez is by tradition celebrated in the first week of May for those who live in Balıkesir. Today, it is the fulfillment of a religious ritual that is celebrated as a day of goodness. The night on the streets there is a fire, and one of the traditions is to jump over the fire seven times. That night going to such green and restful areas as Değirmenboğazı and Balıkesir Park or near the religious area like tombs is also a ritual of Hıdrellez. People wish midnight and meet there. Accordingly, Hıdrellez day people have offerings. Drawing a picture of something that is desired to land or stone is determined. Individuals seeking goods put money into a red purse and hang it on a tree. On the other hand, those wishing for a baby type the name or draws baby figure on the ground. These rituals are traditions of Hıdrellez. One of the superstitions is that if someone takes a shower that night, he or she is protected from all diseases. Hıdrellez is a kind of Nowruz or Spring New Years.

The Liberation Day from the enemy occupation of Balıkesir is 6 September in 1922. Every year, 6 September is celebrating the day as a local holiday. There are a celebration parade and a celebratory ceremony. The ceremony takes place on Stadium Street. In the past, the previous night of 6 September, the main streets of Balıkesir were washed with cologne with lilies, because lilies are a symbol of Balıkesir. This festival is celebrated with great enthusiasm. For two or three days, the people would come from the nearby villages and districts to celebrating. On 6 September morning, people in Balıkesir would picnic in advance of the festival, at Balıkesir Park. The festival evening, a great torchlight procession is organized. Tülü Tabaklar which had designed similarly the cannibals in order to frighten the enemies is a special event of the festival.

The Remembrance Day of Local Combat is called Kuvayi Milliye Haftası in Turkish which is organized between 16–23 May. The great success with 41 Balıkesirer people met at Alaca Mescit and they have managed the region such as a state and gained a military victory in 1922. 15 May 1919, after the capture of İzmir by the Greeks, Balıkesir is the first place in Turkey that the reaction of Balıkesir had shown by declared Redd-i Ilhak (Disclamation of Annexation). In 1919, the city of Balikesir Congress was met five times. Greek soldiers on 30 June 1920 was occupied Balıkesir. By had opened Ayvalik-İvrindi-Soma-Balikesir-front, Balıkesir had its liberation.

Cuisine

Balıkesir's local cheese, called Kelle Peyniri, is known in European countries and exported France, Germany and Britain. It is a granular type of cheese. Hoşmerim which is made from cheese and egg is the popular dessert of this city. Many old Turkmen dishes (like keşkek, güveç, tirit, mantı, kaymaklı) are composed of Balıkesir cuisine.

Souvenirs 
Balıkesir's Turkmen carpets (called Yağcıbedir) are another popular local good. The main souvenir of the city is lily cologne.

Traditional folk dances 

Balıkesir is a historical folkloric dance source. Balıkesir's historical folkloric dance is most popular in Turkey and academical searching. Bengi, Guvende and Balikesir Zeybeği are a typical dance of this city. These dances' figures spread throughout Balıkesir plainness. Also, Balıkesir's ballads are popular in Turkey. Akpınar, Mendili Oyaladım, Karyolamın Demiri are some ballads sing by women surround Balikesir city. Like these woman ballads, on the other hand, have dance figures in terms of traditional dancing. Although Balıkesir is an industrial region, traditional village culture is superb and deeply. So, for folk culture, Balıkesir is an important area in Turkey. Balıkesir's local dance came to first in Nice folk festival joined 21 countries at 1958 be of value by European academical folklore authorities. Also, Balıkesir's local zeibek dance was the first zeibek participation from Turkey which had seen European folk authorities. Nowadays, Balıkesir folklore is chosen "intangible cultural heritage" of Turkey by the Ministry of Culture and Tourism.

Education 

The foundation of Balıkesir University trace back to Karesi Teacher School established in 1910. This school has been carried to the building which is used as Necatibey Faculty of Education with particular interests of the Minister of Education, Mustafa Necati. Till 1982, the number of higher education institutes reached 4: Necati Institution of Education, Architecture and Engineering State Academy, Balıkesir School of Industry and Tourism, Balıkesir Vocational School. These foundations changed status with Delegated Legislation No 41 and were connected to Uludağ University. Necatibey Teacher’s Training School continued to train teachers between the years 1932 and 1982 under the name of Necati Institution of Education, left its 3-year status, received 4-year-Higher Teacher Training School status. In 1982, having been connected to Uludağ University, this foundation has been called Necatibey Faculty of Education.

In the same way, the name of Balıkesir School of Industry and Tourism has been changed as Balıkesir School of Tourism and Hotel Management, but the name of 2-year-Balıkesir Vocational School has remained the same. Having stayed under the roof of Uludağ University for 10 years, these foundations have formed a powerful background for Balıkesir University with healthy and consistent development.

Balıkesir University has more than 37.000 students.

Also, some of the scientists were born in Balıkesir. One of the most known is Selman Akbulut the Turkish mathematician, specializing in research in topology, and geometry and which is a student of Robion Kirby.

Sports 

Many sportspeople were born in Balıkesir. Some of them are;

Cengiz Ünder - Football player
Caner Erkin - Football player
Egemen Korkmaz – Football player
İlhan Eker –  Football player
Olcan Adın –  Football player
Oğuz Savaş – Basketball player
Şafak Edge – Basketball player
Tülin Altıntaş – Volleyball player
Nedim Günar - Football player, coach
Vedat İnceefe - Football player, coach
Seracettin Kırklar - Football player, coach
Çetin Zeybek - Football player

Most known sports club in Balıkesir is Balıkesirspor which is established in 1966. Balıkesirspor is the football team played in the Süper Lig after achieving promotion having finished as runners-up of the TFF First League in 2013–14. The team's previous promotion was 40 years before that. Their stadium, the all-seater Balıkesir Atatürk Stadium, has a capacity of 13,732.

Tourism 

Balıkesir have coastlines both Sea of Marmara and Aegen Sea. Edremit, Burhaniye, Gömeç and Ayvalık are the districts which are popular for their beaches, located in the Aegean coast of the Balıkesir; Marmara Island, Erdek, Gönen and Bandırma are the districts that are located in the Marmara coast of Balıkesir. Ören, Akçay and Altınoluk are also among the holiday towns which attract vacationers interested in a holiday with scenery and historical, archaeological sites.

The Kuş Cenneti National Park near Lake Manyas is an ornithological site where 266 different species of birds flourish – every year over three million birds fly through there. 13 km southeast of Bandırma in Karacabey, horse farms breed magnificent specimens of this majestic animal. Once known as ancient Erteka, Erdek is just 14 km northwest of Bandırma.

Thermal tourism 
Balıkesir and its districts, besides the wealth of thermal resources, have healing waters with high quality of physical and chemical compositions.

Many spas with health-promoting features surround the city, including Pamukçu and Ilıca. The center of the city also contains the historical Turkish "Pasha Hamami" bath, which is still in use. Some of these thermal resources located in;

Pamukçu, Kiraz, Edremit-Güre, Edremit-Bostancı, Edremit-Derman, Gönen, Gönen-Ekşidere, Manyas-Kızık Köy, Susurluk-Kepekler, Balya-Dağ, Bigadiç-Hisarköy, Sındırgı-Hisaralan, Sındırgı-Emendere and Dursunbey-Aşağımusalar Village.

Transportation and accommodation

Balıkesir is a city that has shores on the Aegean and Marmara Seas. It is easy to reach from major cities such as Ankara, İstanbul, Bursa and İzmir by motorway or railway. There are regular coaches from İstanbul, Ankara and İzmir as well as most cities in Turkey. Balıkesir Coach Terminal is out of the city so that there is servicing by the municipality to the city centre.

Railway transport is done between Ankara-Balıkesir and İzmir-Balikesir at specific hours. The railway station is located at Republica Square.

Balıkesir is joined to Bursa and İzmir by a quality motorway. 

Balıkesir Koca Seyit Airport is located in Edremit district, 87 km from city center, serves as an international airport. There is also Balıkesir Airport located in city center, but currently no flights are operated from the airport. 

In Balıkesir there are ten hotels with one five-star hotel.

Climate 
Balıkesir has a fairly continental hot-summer Mediterranean climate (Csa) under the Köppen climate classification and a temperate oceanic climate (Do) under the Trewartha classification. Winters are cool and wet with frequent frosts and occasional snowfall, while summers are hot and dry. The continentality increases as one moves from west to east and north to south. Therefore, winters are colder and snowier in the inland parts.

Politics 

According to official documents, the first head of Balıkesir Municipality is Deratam Efendi. However, in the book entitled "Balıkesir City and Municipal History" written by Kerim Kâni Akpınarlı, it is stated that there were four other municipal heads before Deratam Efendi.

Balıkesir Municipality, in the Official Gazette of the Republic of Turkey, with the law numbered 6360, published on 6 December 2012, Balıkesir Municipality has qualified as a"Metropolitan".

International relations

Twin towns 
Balıkesir is twinned with;

  Shymkent, Kazakhstan (since 1995)
 Kazan, Russia (since 1996)
 Roxas Ctiy, Philippines (since 1997)
   Prizren, Kosovo (since 1997)
 Štip, North Macedonia (since 1999)
 Lefkada, Greece (since 2000)
 Schwäbisch Hall, Germany (since 2006)
 Siirt, Turkey (since 2007)
 Chungcheongnam-do, South Korea (since 2010)

Notable natives

Historical figures 

Firdevsi-i Rumi, Turkish poet and universal scholar
Zağanos Pasha – Ottoman military commander
Seyit Onbaşı - Ottoman army gunner
Kazım Özalp – Military officer in the Ottoman and Turkish armies
Nazmi Solok – Military officer in the Ottoman and Turkish armies
Kurtdereli Mehmet Pehlivan – World-famous oil wrestler
Mehmet Çoban – Olympian Greco-Roman wrestler
Ömer Seyfettin – Writer
Hasan Basri Çantay - Member of 1st parliament of modern Turkey, journalist and poet
Vasıf Çınar - Politician and diplomat
Bekir Sami Günsav, Military officer in the Ottoman and Turkish armies
Ahmet Nuri Öztekin, Military officer in the Ottoman and Turkish armies
Ziya Güler, Lieutenant general

See also
 Altıeylül
 Anatolian Tigers
 Balıkesirspor
 Karesi
 Macarlar

Notes

External links

Balıkesir Municipality Web Page
Balıkesir Government Web Page

 
Populated places in Balıkesir Province
Districts of Balıkesir Province